The following is a list of notable events and releases of the year 1921 in Norwegian music.

Events

Deaths

 June
 7 – Knut Dahle, hardingfele fiddler (born 1834).

 July
 29 – Christian Haslerud, composer and choral conductor (born 1812).

Births

 May
 7 – Reidar Bøe, singer and composer (died 1969).

 April
 20 – Søren Gangfløt, organist and composer (died 1997).

 October
 18 – Willy Andresen, jazz pianist and orchestra leader (died 2016).

 December
 7 – Arne Dørumsgaard, composer, poet, translator and music collector (died 2006).
 19 – Peder Alhaug, tenor (born 2003).

See also
 1921 in Norway
 Music of Norway

References

 
Norwegian music
Norwegian
Music
1920s in Norwegian music